Åke Robert Holmberg (31 May 1907 in Stockholm – 9 September 1991) was a Swedish writer and translator, most famous for his nine children's books about detective Tam Sventon (Swedish: Ture Sventon).

Biography 
Holmberg studied at Stockholm University and graduated with a PhD in 1934. He then worked for several years at the Nordic Museum in Stockholm, and became a full-time author in 1946. Holmberg wrote exclusively youth books, with one exception: the adult novel a breakfast in Aquileia from 1967.

Åke Holmberg was awarded Svenska Dagbladet's Literature Prize in 1948 (together with Stina Aronson, Vilgot Sjöman, Ragnar Bengtsson and Bengt V. Wall). In 1961, he became the recipient of the Nils Holgersson plaque, and in 2007 he received the award Temmelburken at the Book and Library Fair in Gothenburg. In addition to his own books, Holmberg also translated more than 20 books, mainly children's and youth books, from Danish, English and German. Åke Holmberg began the return on all future copyright payments to a fund, the Åke Foundation and Vera Holmberg's scholarship fund.

References

1907 births
1991 deaths
Writers from Stockholm
Swedish crime fiction writers